Kazan Khan is an Indian actor who has predominantly appeared in Malayalam and Tamil films. He is best known for his villain roles.

Filmography

References

External links 
 

Living people
Indian male film actors
Male actors in Tamil cinema
Male actors in Malayalam cinema
Year of birth missing (living people)